Umar Dimayev (1 October 1908 – 26 December 1972) was a Chechen accordionist and folk musician. His sons, Ali, Valid, and Said are also professional Chechen musicians.

Biography

Dimayev was born into a family of peasant farmers on October 1, 1908 in Urus-Martan. Umar was from the Chechen teip Peshkhoy. Despite their relative lack of wealth, the Dimayev family had traditionally been educated in music, as all of Umar's brothers and sisters played the accordion, and Umar would later recall that his younger sister Aruzha would be the one who supported and cultivated his musical abilities.  Although their father discouraged Dimayev from playing the accordion, saying it discouraged the development of his son's masculinity, Aruzha gave away her own instrument to Dimayev and taught him how to play the accordion.  By the age of fifteen, neighbors routinely invited Umar to play at their family celebrations, including weddings, and at bedsides, since they felt that his music helped cure people.[1]

A small radio station opened in Urus-Martan in 1924, and young Umar started playing in local radio broadcasts. Five years later, in 1929, Umar gave a solo performance with the orchestra of the National Theater, to underline his growing popularity in Chechnya. He eventually became the soloist at Gronzy's Chechen-Ingush Dramatic Theatre.[2] He would then work alongside the renowned Russian composer Alexander Alexandrov, who would teach Umar music composition. Several of Umar's compositions during this early period of his career are still played in Chechnya, such as "The Chechen Waltz" of the stage production "The Red Citadel," and a song based on "Bela", a frame story of Mikhail Lermontov's A Hero of Our Time.[3]

By the 1930s, Umar had gained wide recognition throughout the Chechen-Ingush ASSR.  He then served as soloist of the folk band of the Chechen-Ingush radio company, and he won second prize at the first All-Union Folk Musicians contest.[4] By 1934, Dimayev was a well-established Soviet folk musician, becoming a soloist for the Republican Radio Committee and competing in the first nationwide folk music competition in 1939. During the Great Patriotic War (i.e. World War II), Dimayev became involved in the Soviet war effort, writing patriotic works and giving concerts at the front and military hospitals.[5]

However, the lives of the entire Chechen and Ingush people would be dramatically affected by the forced deportation to Central Asia on February 23, 1944, and Umar was deported to Kazakhstan with his entire family.  His son Ali Dimayev would be born in exile in 1953. After initially doing factory work, he joined the Chechen-Ingush Song and Dance Ensemble as a soloist in 1954. He soon began to give performances on Kazakhstan's radio stations, notably in Almaty in 1956. [6] Although the radio transmissions would last barely fifteen minutes, the exiled Chechens would gather at the homes of radio owners to listen to Umar's broadcasts.  His folk songs reminded the Chechen people of their lost homeland, which the bereaved Chechens longed to return to. At the end of the transmission, the men would hide their wet eyes, and the mothers cried quietly.[7]

Upon his return to Chechnya in 1957, Dimayev was declared “Honoured Artist of the Chechen-Ingush ASSR”. His career flourished from 1960 to 1972, with Dimayev giving concerts, performing on radio and television, and making recordings.[8] Some of his best work includes "A Dance For Makhmoud Esambayev", after the renowned Chechen dancer, and "A Song of Chechen-Ukrainian Friendship" (Similar to the Chechen deportations, millions of Ukrainians had died due to the Soviet-directed Holodomor in the 1930s, but thousands of Ukrainians had then been saved from starvation by Chechens [9]), and a dancing tune called "Two Friends". He would also be one of the founders of the "Vainakh" dance company.[10]

After severe and prolonged illness, Dimayev died on December 26, 1972. He left behind his three musically inclined sons, Said, Ali, and Amarbek, along with “some 30 compositions for the accordion and hundreds of recordings of folk music”.[11]

Primary and Secondary Sources 

Although a collection of Dimayev's recordings has been made into a playlist on ‘last.fm’,[12] plenty of recordings have been made available on YouTube. In particular, listeners may want to draw their attention to Ingush Dance Song[13] and Good Love,[14] with the differences in style and tone reflecting Dimayev's versatility.

Footage from Dan Alexe's film The Chechens: A Confession allows us to see the day-to-day life of Chechen mountain villagers before the Russian invasion of the 1990s. Beyond the brief appearance of a tractor in ‘A mountain village in Sufi Chechnya’,[15] the footage presents a village relatively free of modernization, giving us a sense of Dimayev's childhood village. In connection with Dimayev's religious experiences, ‘A burial Sufi ceremony in a Chechen village’[16] shows a Chechen zikir ceremony, a mystical gathering central to Chechen spirituality and resistance that Umar would undoubtedly have witnessed.

Amjad Jaimoukha's The Chechens: A Handbook provides as a valuable guide to understanding these primary sources. Chapters 8 to 12 are exceedingly beneficial, providing one of the only comprehensive overviews of Chechen culture available in English. Chapter 12 is of particular importance when researching Dimayev, with Jaimoukha's detailed overview of Chechen music providing an insight into the melodic and harmonic forms, styles, and instruments that constitute Chechen music. Alongside Jaimoukha's book, Joanna Swirszcz's article ‘The Role of Islam in Chechen National Identity’[17] provides an insight into the way Islam has shaped Chechen culture, with Swirszcz illustrating how the religion became an integral part of Chechen society. Swirszcz's main focus is on the role that Sufism – Islamic mysticism – played in providing a coherent form of resistance against Tsarist and later Soviet Russia, and how Islam's transformative effect allowed Chechens to maintain cohesion during the Stalinist ‘deportation’ to Kazakhstan.

This last point brings us to Moshe Gammer's book The Lone Wolf and the Bear: Three Centuries of Chechen Defiance of Russian Rule.[18] Dealing with three centuries of Russo-Chechen conflict, this book is filled with a wealth of poems, maps, and accounts of Chechen resistance. However, the most valuable chapter with regards to Dimayev is 'Chapter 13: Deportation and Return', which provides first-hand testimony regarding the Chechen ‘deportation’. The vivid descriptions of the horrors of what has been regarded as genocide [19] allow us to understand the traumatic experiences of Dimayev and his people, providing an understanding as to the key importance of his music. This last point will be discussed in the biographical analysis.

Biographical Analysis 

All musicians and composers are bearers of their culture, with composers such as the Armenian Aram Khachaturian serving to both maintain and enhance their homeland's culture through music. However, Chechen musicians play an unusually active societal role, gaining high status in consequence. While they played the usual role of conveying “romantic words of love and the mysteries of life”,[20] they also functioned as history's scribes; exempt from battle, their role was solely “to watch and ‘record’” the scene,[21] creating musical monuments to commemorate past heroes and battles. The role of minstrel included not only singers but instrumentalists, with Magomaev’s 'Prayer of Shamil'[22] conveying the way in which Imam Shamil, the Sufi resistance leader known to the West as “The Lion of Daghestan”,[23] led his outnumbered and weary troops to victory through an ecstatic dance.[24] In playing for the troops at the front during the Great Patriotic War, Dimayev was continuing the tradition of Chechen troubadours, who “accompanied armies on their expeditions to raise morale and instill courage”,[25] while his presence at both the military hospitals of the war years and the Chechen hospitals after the deportation saw him play the role of folk-doctors, who “hymned by the bed of the sick as invocations to ward off evil spirits”.[26] It should also be mentioned that Dimayev was not only an accordionist but the “most famous accordionist” of his day, with Stalin lauding his work in 1939 prior to the Chechen deportation.[27] Hence, the existing traditional roles were accentuated by his unparalleled skill and mastery of his craft.

However, Dimayev's particular importance lies in the role he played during the Chechen deportation. On the 23rd of February 1944, the Chechens were suddenly woken at dawn, “[c]rammed into lorries,… brought to the railway stations and packed ‘like sardines’ into cargo and cattle cars".[28] Taking a twenty-day-long in unventilated trains,[29] the Chechens found their ties to history and their kindred brutally maimed. Deemed an impediment to the journey, many of the aged “who could not be moved from their beds, were either killed or …left to starve unattended”,[30] while at Khaybakh, 770 women, children and aged “were shut in the collective stable, which was then set ablaze”.[31] Aside from the trauma of those who eventually ‘resettled’ in the Kazakh and Kirgiz SSRs, these events marked the destruction of living links to the past, presenting Chechen historical consciousness – and therefore Chechen culture itself – with the danger of total annihilation. Dimayev thus went from scribe to warrior, fighting the extermination of his culture and people by actively linking them back to their origins. Just as the leaders of Qadiriyya Sufi orders [32] linked the Chechens back to God via their place in the silsilah – a “chain …[of] spiritual lineage” tracing back to the Prophet and ultimately to God [33] – Umar's music served to link Chechens back to both their homeland and the departed, retaining their sense of historical consciousness and therefore their distinctive cultural identity. Raman Paskayev recalled how, as a young boy in exile, his fellow Chechens “would gather at the homes of radio owners to listen to Umar’s broadcasts”. The transmissions, lasting barely fifteen minutes, had an overwhelming effect; when they ended, “the men would hide their wet eyes, and the mothers cried quietly”.[34] By bringing Chechens together in this gathering of grief, Dimayev was performing the traditional role of musical healer in an unprecedented manner, healing their hearts by providing an outlet for the expression of a silent, unsurpassable pain. By creating music in his present moment, he provided a living link to the past, giving them the fortitude to resist their systematic extermination. As his son Ali stated during the second Russo-Chechen war, “So long as music and dance are not taken from us, our nation will live, we won't lose our identity, and we won't be defeated”.[35]

Sources 

1.http://www.chechenworld.com/english/people/dimaevu.html

2. Министерство культуры Чеченской Республики, “Умар Димаев,” Министерство культуры Чеченской Республики, http://www.mkchr.com/index.php/znamenitye-chechentsy/87-umar-dimaev.

3. http://www.chechnyafree.ru/?lng=rus&section=cmmodernrus&row=3

4. http://www.chechnyafree.ru/?lng=eng&section=musiceng&row=30

5. Министерство культуры Чеченской Республики, “Умар Димаев,” Министерство культуры Чеченской Республики, http://www.mkchr.com/index.php/znamenitye-chechentsy/87-umar-dimaev.

6. Министерство культуры Чеченской Республики, “Умар Димаев,” Министерство культуры Чеченской Республики, http://www.mkchr.com/index.php/znamenitye-chechentsy/87-umar-dimaev.

7. http://www.chechnya.cjes.ru/journal/?j_id=12&c_id=297

8. Министерство культуры Чеченской Республики, “Умар Димаев,” Министерство культуры Чеченской Республики, http://www.mkchr.com/index.php/znamenitye-chechentsy/87-umar-dimaev.

9. http://www.artukraine.com/famineart/chechens.htm

10. http://www.chechenworld.com/english/people/dimaevu.html

11. Amjad Jaimoukha, The Chechens: A Handbook (New York: RoutledgeCurzon, 2005), 187.

12. Умар Димаев, “Top Tracks,” Last.fm, http://www.last.fm/music/%D0%A3%D0%BC%D0%B0%D1%80+%D0%94%D0%B8%D0%BC%D0%B0%D0%B5%D0%B2/+tracks.

13. Kavkaz Muzika, “Ингушская Танцевальная Песня - Умар Димаев,” YouTube, https://www.youtube.com/watch?v=-90fg44ND-Q.

14. Kavkaz Muzika, “Хорошая любовь - Умар Димаев,” YouTube, https://www.youtube.com/watch?v=wlR6znMo1RQ.

15. Dan Alexe, “A mountain village in Sufi Chechnya...,” YouTube, https://www.youtube.com/watch?v=E7su9Hfw1DI.

16. Dan Alexe, “A burial Sufi ceremony in a Chechen village...,” YouTube, https://www.youtube.com/watch?v=fj6QID8XJMo.

17. Joanna Swirszcz, “The Role of Islam in Chechen National Identity,” Nationalities Papers 37.1 (2009): 59–88.

18. Moshe Gammer, The Lone Wolf and the Bear: Three Centuries of Chechen Defiance of Russian Rule (Pittsburgh: University of Pittsburgh Press, 2006).

19. Gammer, 174.

20. Jaimoukha, 182.

21. Jaimoukha, 182.

22. Кисмет Рекорд, “Молитва Шамиля, народный танец,” Russian-Records.com, http://www.russian-records.com/details.php?image_id=23032&l=russian.

23. Charles Le Gai Eaton, Islam and the Destiny of Man (Albany: State University of New York Press, 1985), 217.

24. Jaimoukha, 185.

25. Jaimoukha, 185.

26. Jaimoukha, 182.

27. Sonia Kishkovsky, “Chechens Hope Their Muses Are Louder Than Bombs,” New York Times, May 23, 2000, Arts/Cultural Desk, Arts Abroad, 2.

28. Gammer, 168.

29. Gammer, 172–3.

30. Gammer, 169.

31. Gammer, 170.

32. Gammer, 178.

33. Martin Lings, What is Sufism? (Lahore: Suhail Academy, 2005), 38.

34. Рамзан Паскаев, “Biography,” Last.fm, http://www.last.fm/music/%D0%A0%D0%B0%D0%BC%D0%B7%D0%B0%D0%BD+%D0%9F%D0%B0%D1%81%D0%BA%D0%B0%D0%B5%D0%B2/+wiki.

35. Kishkovsky, 2.

Bibliography 

Dan Alexe. “A burial Sufi ceremony in a Chechen village....” YouTube. https://www.youtube.com/watch?v=fj6QID8XJMo (accessed May 5, 2015).

Dan Alexe. “A mountain village in Sufi Chechnya....” YouTube. https://www.youtube.com/watch?v=E7su9Hfw1DI (accessed May 5, 2015).

Kavkaz Muzika. “Ингушская Танцевальная Песня - Умар Димаев.” YouTube. https://www.youtube.com/watch?v=-90fg44ND-Q (accessed May 5, 2015).

Kavkaz Muzika. “Хорошая любовь - Умар Димаев.” YouTube. https://www.youtube.com/watch?v=wlR6znMo1RQ (accessed May 5, 2015).

Kishkovsky, Sonia. “Chechens Hope Their Muses Are Louder Than Bombs.” New York Times, May 23, 2000, Arts/Cultural Desk, Arts Abroad.

Кисмет Рекорд. “Молитва Шамиля, народный танец.” Russian-Records.com. http://www.russian-records.com/details.php?image_id=23032&l=russian (accessed May 5, 2015).

Министерство культуры Чеченской Республики. “Умар Димаев.” Министерство культуры Чеченской Республики. http://www.mkchr.com/index.php/znamenitye-chechentsy/87-umar-dimaev (accessed May 5, 2015).

Рамзан Паскаев. “Biography.” Last.fm. http://www.last.fm/music/%D0%A0%D0%B0%D0%BC%D0%B7%D0%B0%D0%BD+%D0%9F%D0%B0%D1%81%D0%BA%D0%B0%D0%B5%D0%B2/+wiki (accessed May 5, 2015).

Умар Димаев, “Top Tracks,” Last.fm, http://www.last.fm/music/%D0%A3%D0%BC%D0%B0%D1%80+%D0%94%D0%B8%D0%BC%D0%B0%D0%B5%D0%B2/+tracks (accessed May 5, 2015).

Eaton, Charles Le Gai. Islam and the Destiny of Man. Albany: State University of New York Press, 1985.

Gammer, Moshe. The Lone Wolf and the Bear: Three Centuries of Chechen Defiance of Russian Rule. Pittsburgh: University of Pittsburgh Press, 2006.

Jaimoukha, Amjad. The Chechens: A Handbook. New York: RoutledgeCurzon, 2005.

Lings, Martin. What is Sufism?. Lahore: Suhail Academy, 2005.

Swirszcz, Joanna. “The Role of Islam in Chechen National Identity.” Nationalities Papers 37.1 (2009): 59–88.

External links
Chechen World Biographical Information on Umar Dimayev
 Sobar Biographical Information on Umar Dimayev
Chechnya Free.ru Biographical Stub on Umar Dimayev
 Chechnya Free.ru Biography of Umar Dimayev

1908 births
1972 deaths
Chechen male singers
Soviet male singers